Alçalı may refer to:

 Alçalı, Salyan, a village in the Salyan Rayon of Azerbaijan
 Alçalı, Kalbajar, a village in the Kalbajar Rayon of Azerbaijan
 Ağbulaq, Kalbajar, a village in the Kalbajar Rayon of Azerbaijan, known as Alçalı until 2015
 Günəşqaya, a village in the Kalbajar Rayon of Azerbaijan, known as Alçalı until 2015